The Liberal-Conservative Party was the formal name of the Conservative Party of Canada until 1873, and again from 1922 to 1938, although some Conservative candidates continued to run under the label as late as the 1911 election and others ran as simple Conservatives before 1873. In many of Canada's early elections, there were both "Liberal-Conservative" and "Conservative" candidates; however, these were simply different labels used by candidates of the same party. Both were part of Sir John A. Macdonald's government and official Conservative and Liberal-Conservative candidates would not, generally, run against each other. It was also common for a candidate to run on one label in one election and the other in a subsequent election.

History
The roots of the name are in the coalition of 1853 in which moderate Reformers and Conservatives from Canada West joined with bleus from Canada East under the dual premiership of Sir Allan MacNab and A.-N. Morin.  The new ministry committed to secularizing Clergy reserves in Canada West and abolishing seigneurial tenure in Canada East.  Over time, the Liberal-Conservatives evolved into the Conservative party and their opponents, the Clear Grits and the Parti rouge evolved into the Liberal Party of Canada.  On October 12, 1916, the last Liberal-Conservative cabinet minister, Sam Hughes, was dismissed, making the executive all officially Conservative Party members.

Prominent Liberal-Conservative Members of Parliament and Senators in Canadian history include:
Sir John A. Macdonald
Sir George-Étienne Cartier
Sir Alexander Tilloch Galt
John Carling
Sir John Rose
Thomas D'Arcy McGee
Joseph Howe
Sir Samuel Leonard Tilley
Sir John Joseph Caldwell Abbott
John Henry Pope
Joseph-Aldric Ouimet (Liberal-Conservative MP 1873–1896, ran as Conservative and defeated in 1908)
Sir John Sparrow David Thompson
Sir Samuel Hughes
Sir Hugh John Macdonald
Archibald McLelan (Liberal-Conservative Senator, resigned and elected to the House of Commons as a Conservative after 1881)
Joseph Godéric Blanchet (Liberal-Conservative from 1867 to 1875, Conservative 1875–1878, Liberal-Conservative 1878–1883)
John Costigan (Liberal-Conservative 1867–1900, crossed the floor to join the Liberals in 1901)

The party resumed formally referring to itself as Liberal-Conservative from 1922 until 1938 when it officially became the National Conservative Party, however, it was commonly referred to as the Conservative Party throughout this period.

Liberal Conservative coalition
In the 1957 election, George Rolland, a watchmaker, sought election as a Liberal Conservative Coalition candidate in the Toronto riding of Eglinton. He placed last, winning only 252 votes, or 0.7% of the total. Both the Liberal and Conservative parties nominated candidates in the riding, so Rolland did not have the endorsement of either party.

Source: Parliament of Canada History of the Federal Electoral Ridings since 1867

See also
Conservative Party of Canada (1867–1942)
List of political parties in Canada
Democratic-Republican Party

References

Further reading
 Creighton, Donald Grant. John A. Macdonald: The Old Chieftain. Vol. 2. (1955).
 English, John. The Decline of Politics: The Conservatives and the Party System, 1901-20 (1977)
 Gwyn, Richard J. Nation Maker: Sir John A. Macdonald: His Life, Our Times. 1867-1891. Volume Two (2011)
 Neatby, H. Blair, and John T. Saywell. "Chapleau and the Conservative Party in Quebec." Canadian Historical Review 37 (1956): 17. online

Primary sources
 J. H. Stewart Reid, et al., eds. A Source-book of Canadian History: Selected Documents and Personal Papers (1964). online pp 333–49

Defunct political parties in Canada
Political parties established in 1864
Conservative Party of Canada (1867–1942)
1864 establishments in Canada